Beetham is a civil parish in the South Lakeland District of Cumbria, England. It contains 47 listed buildings that are recorded in the National Heritage List for England. Of these, four are listed at Grade I, the highest of the three grades, four are at Grade II*, the middle grade, and the others are at Grade II, the lowest grade.  The parish contains the villages of Beetham, Farleton and Hazelslack, and the surrounding countryside.  The Lancaster Canal passes through the parish, and the listed buildings associated with this are bridges, an aqueduct and a milestone.  Most of the listed buildings in the parish are houses, some of them originally tower houses, and associated structures, farmhouses and farm buildings.  The other listed buildings consist of a church, bridges, a former corn mill, milestones and a milepost, boundary stones and a boundary post, a former school, a signal box, and a war memorial.


Key

Buildings

References

Citations

Sources

Lists of listed buildings in Cumbria